The 1996 MTV Video Music Awards aired live on September 4, 1996, honoring the best music videos from June 16, 1995, to June 14, 1996. The show was hosted by Dennis Miller at Radio City Music Hall in New York City.

The show centered on The Smashing Pumpkins, who led the pack that night with nine nominations. Having lost their touring keyboardist days before this appearance to a heroin overdose, and kicked longtime, original drummer Jimmy Chamberlin out of the band, the band opened the show as a three-piece, performing an awe-inspiring, emotional version  of "Tonight, Tonight."  What is more, the Pumpkins ended up winning seven of the awards they were up for: "Tonight, Tonight" earned six wins out of its eight nominations, including Video of the Year, thus making it the night's most nominated and biggest winning video; while their video for "1979" earned the one Moonman it was nominated for: Best Alternative Video.

The next biggest nominee and winner that night was Canadian singer Alanis Morissette, who won three out of her six nominations for her video "Ironic."  Tying with her in terms of nominations was Icelandic singer Björk, who also received six; however, her video for "It's Oh So Quiet" only took home one Moonman for Best Choreography.  Closely following with five nominations each were Coolio, the Foo Fighters, and Bone Thugs-n-Harmony.  Out of these, though, only the former two ended up taking home some Moonmen for their videos.  Coolio won three, as "Gangsta's Paradise" won two out of its three nominations, and "1, 2, 3, 4 (Sumpin' New)" won one out of its two nominations, while the Foo Fighters' "Big Me" took home one Moonman for Best Group Video.  Bone Thugs-n-Harmony, meanwhile, went home empty-handed.

Highlights of the show included a pre-show set by No Doubt, who performed on the entrance marquee of Radio City Music Hall.  There was also a short-lived reunion of the four original members of Van Halen, who had not appeared together at that time for more than a decade, presenting the award for Best Male Video, as well as a live interlink with astronauts on the Mir space station.  The show also marked Tupac Shakur's final public appearance before being shot four times in a drive-by shooting in Las Vegas, Nevada, three days later on September 7, dying of his wounds on September 13.

Background
MTV announced in June that the 1996 Video Music Awards would be held at Radio City Music Hall for the third consecutive year on September 4. Nominees were announced at a press conference hosted by Hootie & the Blowfish and MTV president Judy McGrath on July 30. Dennis Miller was announced as the host on August 14. The ceremony broadcast was preceded by the 1996 MTV Video Music Awards Opening Act. Hosted by Kurt Loder and Tabitha Soren with reports from Serena Altschul, Chris Connelly, John Norris, and Alison Stewart, the broadcast featured red carpet interviews, pre-taped interviews with The Smashing Pumpkins and Oasis, a report on the East Coast-West Coast hip hop rivalry, and performances from Beck and No Doubt.

Performances

Presenters

Main show
 Mariah Carey – presented Best Group Video
 Kevin Bacon and Rosie O'Donnell – presented Best New Artist in a Video
 Claudia Schiffer and Red Hot Chili Peppers (Anthony Kiedis and Flea) – presented Best Dance Video
 Béla Károlyi – appeared in several backstage vignettes with Lars Ulrich and Hootie & the Blowfish
 Toni Braxton and Dennis Rodman – presented Breakthrough Video
 Norm Macdonald (as Bob Dole) – appeared in a pre-commercial vignette about Viewer's Choice voting
 Beck and Chris Rock – presented Best R&B Video
 Michael Buffer – introduced LL Cool J
 Geena Davis – presented Best Direction in a Video
 Cosmonauts Valery Korzun and Aleksandr Kaleri – interviewed by host Dennis Miller live via satellite from the Mir space station
 Jenny McCarthy and Damon Wayans – presented Best Rap Video
 2Pac and Snoop Doggy Dogg – presented Best Hard Rock Video
 Seal – introduced Alanis Morissette
 Darrell Hammond (as Bill Clinton) – appeared in a pre-commercial vignette about Viewer's Choice voting
 Beavis and Butt-head – introduced the International Viewer's Choice Award winners
 VJs Rahul Khanna (India), George Williams (Japan), Eden Harel (Europe), Sabrina Parlatore (Brasil), Edith Serrano (Latin America), Mike Kasem (Asia) and Stacy Hsu (Mandarin) – announced their respective region's Viewer's Choice winner
 Tim Robbins – presented Best Alternative Video
 Janeane Garofalo – introduced The Cranberries
 Gwyneth Paltrow – introduced the winners of the professional categories
 Aerosmith (Steven Tyler and Joe Perry) – presented Viewer's Choice
 Ewan McGregor and Ewen Bremner – introduced Oasis
 Van Halen – presented Best Male Video
 Susan Sarandon – presented Best Female Video
 Jay Leno – appeared in a "coming up" vignette hyping the Video of the Year award and the Kiss performance
 Sharon Stone – presented Video of the Year

Post-show
 John Norris and Alison Stewart – presented Best Video from a Film

Winners and nominees
Winners are in bold text.

See also
1996 MTV Europe Music Awards

External links
 Official MTV site

References

1996
MTV Video Music Awards
MTV Video Music Awards